Western Power Corporation (WPC), owned by the Government of Western Australia, was Western Australia's major electricity supplier from 1995 until 2006.

It was formed in 1995 when the monopoly electricity and gas supplier, the State Energy Commission of Western Australia, was disaggregated into separate suppliers for gas (AlintaGas) and electricity (WPC).

In 2006, WPC was disaggregated into Western Power, Synergy, Horizon Power and Verve Energy.

Notes

External links
 Government of Western Australia - Office of Energy
 Government of Western Australia - Office of Energy - Electricity Reform Implementation Unit

Companies based in Perth, Western Australia
Defunct government-owned companies of Australia
Defunct utility companies of Western Australia
Energy in Western Australia
Australian companies established in 1995
Energy companies established in 1995
Australian companies disestablished in 2006
Energy companies disestablished in 2006
Defunct electric power companies of Australia